The Tikchik River is a   long stream in the U.S. state of Alaska. Tikchik Lake empties into the Nuyakuk River, a tributary of the Nushagak River, which flows to Nushagak Bay, an arm of Bristol Bay.

Both lakes and the river lie within Wood-Tikchik State Park, at  the largest state park in the United States.

Alaska Fishing says the river "makes an exciting float...with some potentially good fishing...".  Boating dangers include overhanging vegetation and bears, which feed on salmon. The main game fish frequenting the Tikchik are Arctic grayling, char, and red salmon, as well as lake trout in the lakes.

See also
List of rivers of Alaska

References

Rivers of Dillingham Census Area, Alaska
Rivers of Alaska
Rivers of Unorganized Borough, Alaska